Sun Ju-kyung (Hangul: 선주경; born January 19, 1991), better known by his stage name Ugly Duck (Hangul: 어글리 덕), is a South Korean singer. He released his debut album, Scene Stealers with Jay Park, on July 13, 2016.

Discography

Extended plays

Singles

Other charted songs

Notes

References

External links

1991 births
Living people
South Korean male rappers
South Korean hip hop singers
21st-century South Korean male  singers